Shahr-e Zuhak or Zuhak City, also known as The Red City, is a historic city ruins in Bamyan, Afghanistan which was once home to 3,000 people. 
The fortress is believed to have been founded between 500-600 AD by the Hephthalites, around the same time as the Buddhas of Bayman were created. The city lies at the easternmost point of the Bayman valley, above the confluence of the Kunduz and Kalu Ganga rivers. The valley used to be a part of a route connecting Europe to India and China.
  
Zuhak was fortified during the Islamic period (10th - 13th Century), under the rule of the Ghaznavid and Ghorid dynasties. The fortress was later ransacked by Genghis Khan and his army during the Mongol siege of Bayman, as a part of the greater invasion of the Khwarazmian Empire.

The fortress was protected by ramparts, built along the steep cliffs bounding the site, which were equipped with several watchtowers, some of which still stand today. The citadel was protected by three more orders of walls and was located on the topmost part of the hill. Due to prolonged exposure and a lack of conservation, exacerbated by recent periods of war, many of the structures on the site have collapsed or are prone to collapse.

See also 

 Bamyan, Afghanistan
 Shahr-e Gholghola

References

Hazara people
Hazarajat
Bamyan Province